Kwon Jun-cheol (born 16 November 1988) is a South Korean sports shooter. He competed in the men's 50 metre rifle prone event at the 2016 Summer Olympics.

References

External links
 

1988 births
Living people
South Korean male sport shooters
Olympic shooters of South Korea
Shooters at the 2016 Summer Olympics
Place of birth missing (living people)
Asian Games medalists in shooting
Asian Games silver medalists for South Korea
Shooters at the 2014 Asian Games
Medalists at the 2014 Asian Games
20th-century South Korean people
21st-century South Korean people